Stone Wall is an escarpment overlooking the Murchison River Gorge about  north-east of Kalbarri in Mid West Western Australia. It is of geological interest because it provides outstanding exposures of five Cretaceous formations unconformably overlying the Ordovician Tumblagooda sandstone. The Cretaceous formations contain trace fossils of Skolithos and Cylindricum. It has been visited on geological excursions and is considered an important research site.

References

 
 

Escarpments
Geology of Western Australia
Heritage places of Western Australia
Western Australian places listed on the defunct Register of the National Estate
Mid West (Western Australia)